Elections to Calderdale Metropolitan Borough Council were held on 1 May 2008. One third of the council was up for election and the council stayed under no overall control with a minority Conservative administration.

On 9 May, about a week after being elected as a Liberal Democrat, Greetland and Stainland Councillor Keith Watson left the Liberal Democrats and joined the Conservative Party.

In 2009 the Skircoat Councillor Geoffrey Wainwright died suddenly. A by-election was held on 2 April 2009. The seat was held by the Conservative Party with John Hardy winning the seat.

In June 2009 Elland Councillor Diane Park quit the Liberal Democrats due to the state of the party in the House of Commons. She continued as an independent.

Council composition
Prior to the election the composition of the council was:

After the election the composition of the council was:

Ward results

Brighouse ward

The incumbent was Nick Yates for the Liberal Democrats. He had been elected as a Conservative.

Calder ward

The incumbent was Janet Battye for the Liberal Democrats.

Elland ward

The incumbent was Pat Allen for the Liberal Democrats.

Greetland and Stainland ward

The incumbent was Keith Watson for the Liberal Democrats.

Hipperholme and Lightcliffe ward

The incumbent was Graham Hall for the Conservative Party

Illingworth and Mixenden ward

The incumbent was Judith Gannon for the Labour Party.

Luddendenfoot ward

The incumbent was Christine Bampton-Smith for the Liberal Democrats.

Northowram and Shelf ward

The incumbent was Graham Reason for the Conservative Party.

Ovenden  ward

The incumbent was Danielle Coombs for the Labour Party.

Park ward

The incumbent was Mohammed Najib for the Labour Party.

Rastrick ward

The incumbent was Ann McAllister for the Conservative Party.

Ryburn ward

The incumbent was Geraldine Carter for the Conservative Party.

Skircoat ward

The incumbent was Geoffrey Wainwright for the Conservative Party.

Sowerby Bridge ward

The incumbent was Amanda Byrne for the Conservative Party.

Todmorden ward

The incumbent was Anne Townley for the Liberal Democrats.

Town ward

The incumbent was Megan Swift for the Labour Party.

Warley ward

The incumbent was Allen Clegg as an Independent.

By-elections between 2008 and 2010

Skircoat ward, 2009

References

 Election of District Councillors - 2 May 2008. calderdale.gov.uk.
 Calderdale Council elections - see all the results. Halifax Courier.

2008
2008 English local elections
2000s in West Yorkshire